La mort d'Adam is a tragédie lyrique on a biblical theme in 3 acts by Jean-François Le Sueur with a French libretto by Nicolas-François Guillard after Klopstock, first performed in 1809, though written a few years earlier.

Composition and performance history
Le Sueur wrote the opera while working as an instructor at the Conservatoire de Musique in Paris. The opera was initially scheduled to be performed at the Conservatoire but was dropped in favor of Charles-Simon Catel's Sémiramis. Upset over this decision, Le Sueur published anonymously a pamphlet entitled , in which he harshly criticized the methods of instruction followed at the Conservatoire, his rival Catel, and Catel's patron, the director of the Conservatoire. Le Sueur was subsequently fired from the Conservatoire on 23 September 1802, and the composer lived in a state of poverty for about a year before he became  to the First Consul in Paris in early 1804.

Eventually, Le Sueur was able to mount a production of La mort d'Adam. The opera was first performed at the Académie impériale in Paris on 21 March 1809, with a choreography by Louis-Jacques Milon (act 1) and Pierre-Gabriel Gardel (acts 2, 3), "but it failed to arouse much enthusiasm and had to be dropped from the repertory permanently on 4 February 1810 after 16 performances".

Winton Dean argues that the opera had a great influence on Berlioz, Le Sueur's pupil shortly after the full score was published, and that "certain elements in Berlioz's style can be explained only by reference to Le Sueur". Le Sueur annotated his score, in French and Italian, with explanations about the musical language in antiquity which he had incorporated into his work, and some of these devices are found in later works by Berlioz, such as Les Troyens and L'enfance du Christ.

Roles

References

Operas
French-language operas
1809 operas
Operas by Jean-François Le Sueur
Operas based on the Bible
Cultural depictions of Adam and Eve
Libretti by Nicolas-François Guillard